Maan is not a city name. Dahiwadi taluka is called as Maan taluka because land it's situated on Maan river that reason it's called Maan.Sub division dahiwadi is in Satara district of Maharashtra in India. Dahiwadi is tehsil place of maan taluka.

Geography
Maan (Dahiwadi) taluka is one of the important taluka of Satara District. Maan is located at Dahiwadi (Maan T; 17° 40' N, 74° 30' E; RS Koregaon 28 m. The river banks are low and the village is spread along the sides for about a quarter of mile. The last village of Maan taluka is Shenwadi which is located on Malharpeth - Pandharpur {SH-143}.
India's many big politicians always gives visit to this taluka but the problems of water, road, electricity are not solved yet.

Places of interest around Mann
Tirthaksetra's in Maan Tahsil are {Shikhar Shinganapur} (Maharashtra's Kuladaivatya),(Bhojling Temple) Dahiwadi (Shri Kashipate Nilakanth Maharaj ), Mohi (Shri Mahalaxmi Temple), Mardi (Bhavani Aai Mandir), Gondawale (Shri BrahmaChaitanya Gondavalekar Maharaj), Pingali B.K. (Bhavani Aai), {Mhaswad} {Shree Siddhanath Maharaj Jogeshwari Maata Mandir}, Malawadi (Khandoba, Shri Mahant Shantigiriji Maharaj, Biroba, Satoba Mandir's), Kulakjai (Sitabai Mandir), Kirkasal (Shri Nath Mandir), Kukudwad (Mahadev Mandir), Dhuldev Mahakaleshwar (Dhuloba Mandir), Virkarwadi (Nagoba Mandir), {Shenwadi} {Shree Nath Mhaskoba Mandir}
There are some forts around Maan Tahsil such as {Varugad} & {Mahimangad}.

Climate
Maan's climate is an inland climate of Maharashtra. The temperature has a relatively high range between 15 °C to 45 °C. Summer in Maan is comparatively hot, and dry, compared to neighbouring inland cities. Maximum temperatures exceed 40 °C every summer and typically range between 38 and 45 °C. Lows during this season are around 25 °C to 28 °C.

The city receives very little rainfall from June to September and it is declared as a drought prone place by the government. The city even sometimes gets no rainfall during the rainy season.

Maan experiences winter from November to February. The winter temperatures are significantly higher compared to other cities in Maharashtra such as Pune and Nashik. Lows range from 14 °C to 16 °C while highs are in the range of 29 °C to 32 °C. Humidity is low in this season making weather much more pleasant.

Maan comes in draught prone area and going towards south and south-west of Maan, dry area begins. Water supply to Maan for drinking and irrigation is done by water from Adhali Dam on Maan river situated on boundary line of Maan and Taluka.

Culture
Maan is a very ancient city. There is a Temple of Lord Shiva at Shikhar Shingnapur, Sarveshwar mandir in Narawane (people have superstitious belief about ganapati), Jogeshwari Temple in Jambhulani, Shri Sarvling Temple in Valai, Shri Mahalaxmi Mandir (Mohi), Tulja Bhawani Mandir (Mardi), Shri Sidhhanath Mandir (Mhaswad), Shri NathSaheb Mandir (Kiraksal), Shri Janubai Mandir (Virali), {Shri Nath Mhaskoba Mandir} at {Shenwadi}, Ganesh Mandir in Virali. Nagoba mandir (Mhaswad Virkarwadi). Festivals like {Chhatrapati Shivaji Maharaj Jayanti}, Gudipadva, Hanuman Jayanti, Akshaya Tritiya,Bandur ,Nagpanchami, Ganesh Chaturthi, Ganesh Jayanti, Vijayadashmi - Dasshera, Diwali, {Yatra (Jatra)} once in a year are celebrated.

Markets (Bazaar)
Dahiwadi & Shingnapur (Monday)
Mhaswad (Wednesday)
Gondawale Budruk & Bidal (Thursday)
Mardi & Bijawadi (Friday)
Palashi & Wavarhire (Saturday)
Mohi & Malawadi (Sunday)
Injabav (Sunday)
Virali (Saturday)
Pusegaon (Thursday)
Koregaon (Monday)
Vaduj (Saturday)
Varkute - Malawadi (Friday)
Gondawale Khurd & Mohi (Sunday)
Ranand (Sunday)
Kaledhon (Tuesday)
Kukudwad (Friday)
Naravane (Tuesday)

Education
Maan has a significant footprint in the area of education. Karmveer Bhaurao Patil, one of the rulers of Maan started Dahiwadi College Dahiwadi & Mahatma Gandhi High School and Junior College way back in 1965. Apart from Dahiwadi college, Maan has mahatma Gandhi Jr. college, Bramhachaitanya College, Mahalaxmi College, Biroba Vidyalaya Pangri, New English School Virkarwadi, Paramedical College Masalwadi, Mery Mata High School, Mhankaleshwar Vidyalaya Dhuldev, Veer Santaji Ghorpade Vidyalaya Karkhel, Dnyanvardheeni College Mhaswad, Sidhanath Hight School Mhaswad, Kbp Vidyalaya Pulkoti, KBP College Devapur, many primary and high school Balbhavan and various other private schools running in the taluka. One new English Medium School has been started in the Mhaswad & Dahiwadi. So there are currently 2 English medium schools in Maan. Recently in last two years, Dahiwadi College has started a BCA syllabus for its Computer Education. There is government D.Ed. college only for the girls at Mhaswad. Colleges in Maharashatra since last more than 35 years. Also there is open university college of nashik -OIIT College of IT. For BCA, MCA.and also there is a polytechnic college 'Dahiwadi polytechnic college, Dahiwadi' providing diploma in engineering for five basic trades (mechanical, computer, electrical, electronics, civil).

Mhaswad 

Mhaswad (Maan T; 17° 35' N, 74° 45' E; RS Koreganv 43 m. It lies on the Satara-Pandharpur road on the left bank of the Maan. Mhaswad is enclosed by a ruined mud wall with corner bastions. The town has one main street running from east to west and leading to the Pandharpur road which runs round the north of the town. It is about half a mile long and thirty feet broad with on each side grain and cloth shops. A weekly market is held on Wednesday. It is an important trade centre.

Population
The population of the town according to 1951 Census was 9,149. Of this the agricultural classes number 3,796 and the non-agricultural classes 5,349; of the latter, 2,681 persons derive their principal means of livelihood from production other than cultivation; 901 persons from commerce; 92 persons from transport; and 1,676 persons from other services and miscellaneous sources.

Municipal Constitution
Mhaswad is a municipal town with an area of  where municipality was established in the year 1857. It is governed under the Bombay District Municipal Act, 1901. The total number of members in the municipal council is 15. Two seats are reserved for women and two seats for the Scheduled Castes. The administration is looked after by committees viz., the Managing, the school and the dispensary committees. The Secretary is the administrative head of the municipality.

Income and Expenditure
For the year 1957-58, the total income of the municipality, excluding extraordinary and debt heads, amounted to Rs. 71,885; from municipal rates and taxes Rs. 53,948; revenue derived from municipal property and powers apart from taxation Rs. 10,340; and grants and contributions Rs. 7,597. The expenditure incurred for the same year excluding extraordinary and debt heads amounted to Rs. 69,959; general administration and collection charges being Rs. 16,062; public safety Rs. 3,560; public health and convenience Rs. 37,581; contribution Rs. 2,557 and miscellaneous Rs. 10,199.

Water Supply
The main source of water supply is the Maan river. The municipality has constructed a well and has bored small holes in the river bed. The municipality had a scheme for perManent water-supply under its Consideration in 1959.

Drainage
There is no proper drainage system. Kaccha gutters have been dug-and water is allowed to gather in cess pools.

Education
Primary education is compulsory and is Managed by the District School Board. The municipality pays a yearly contribution of Rs. 4,300. The municipality runs a secondary school which was started in 1957.

Health Care
A dispensary situated within the municipal limits receives grant-in-aid from the municipality.

The veterinary dispensary is Managed by the District Local Board. The municipality pays an annual contribution of Rs. 400. The total length of roads is  all of which are Kaccha roads.

Crematorium
There are two burial places on the south side of the Mhaswad Gaothan.

Parks
Rajmata punyashlok Ahilyadevi Holkar garden

Temples

Nath Temple
Near the west entrance of the town in the north side of the street is the temple of Shiddhanath usually called Nath. The original structure is evidently ancient and recoursed. The Gabhara or image-chamber, with an internal area of 20' by 20' but outside about 30' by 30' is of the star shape and built of gray basalt. It contains images of Nath and his wife Jogai in human form. The walls are ten feet high. The original unmortared blocks have been replaced by smaller ones in mortar but the old shape has been retained. The spire, thirty feet high is of brick and lime with a series of octagonal concentric storeys. The Mandap has a vestibule about 6' by 6' the walls of which are in black basalt and have a wainscot of carved stone figures. This leads into a Mandap an oblong structure (30' X 30') with a roof ten feet high. In the centre are four of the ancient pillars in the usual octagonal cylindrical and rectangular courses excellently carved and moulded. The whole is on a plinth four feet high. Outside this is a modern court about fifty feet square enclosed on three sides by rude verandahs of stone and mud with wooden pillars. On the wall of the western verandah is embedded a large black stone on which is a very plainly written Kanarese inscription. Every evening Puranas are read here by a Brahman. On the fourth or southern side is a detached hall on wooden pillars about 50' by 30' and beyond this again an uncovered court. Just outside the southern end of the hall is a large black stone Elephant about 5' high and 4' broad with the right foot raised and trunk curled. A legend explains that Nath rescued from drowning in the Ganges the Elephant of which this is the image. It is much venerated and Many offerings are presented to it. Attached to the right foot is a small Chain and the story goes that rheumatism can be cured by waving the Chain over the shoulders; also that if any one fails while visiting the temple to give a suitable offering to the Elephant, the chain will be discovered next day in his field, and he will have to return it to the temple under pain of severe calamities arising from the displeasure of Nath. The court also contains at the south-east corner a fine lamp-pillar. Two archways lead into the street of which the inner about thirty feet high is a little higher than the outer archway. Who built the original temple is not known, as the inscription has not been made out. The courts, archways, lamp-pillar and restorations are mostly about 200 years old, the work of Balaji Dabal a member of the Karad Deshchaughule family. Minor repairs to the temple were carried out from time to time to preserve it in a good condition (1960). A yearly fair is held on the bright first of Margshirsh or November–December, when the masks of the images are driven in a carriage. Besides the usual articles of trade this fair, which is attended by about 22,000 people and lasts for about fifteen days, has a special traffic in horses and cattle. The number of cattle and horses, sheep and goats exhibited reaches about 3,000, and as much as Rs. 30,000 are estimated to change hands. Six miles south-east of Mhaswad at Rajevadi in the Atpadi territory is the great Mhaswad irrigation lake which when full covers an area of six square miles [Details of the Mhaswad irrigation lake are given above in Chapter on 'Agriculture and Irrigation'.].

Mhaswad was the home of the Mane family who were its Deshmukhs. The Manes were distinguished Shiledars under the Bijapur Government but nearly as notorious for their revengeful character as the Shirkes [Grant Duff's Marathas, Vol. I, 70.]. The most glaring example of which could be found in the assassination of Santaji Ghorpade, the Maratha General during the period of Rajaram.
</
Nagoba temple also famous.

References

External links
Mandeshi.com
Mandesh.com
Shikharshingnapur.com
Manndeshi Mahila Bank
Photo essay on the drought scenario in Maan taluk

Cities and towns in Satara district
Talukas in Maharashtra